Rebecca Welch is an English football referee from Washington, Tyne and Wear who, in 2021, became the first woman to be appointed to referee an English Football League match, when she was appointed to referee a League Two match between Harrogate Town and Port Vale, that took place at Harrogate's EnviroVent Stadium on 5 April.

Career 
Having worked as an administrator with the National Health Service, Welch became a football referee in 2010, but continued to work in her NHS post until 2019. She had played football from a young age, and studied to be a referee with Durham County Football Association. Her first two matches were women's university games, followed by a Sunday League match in Sunderland, something she has described as being "a completely different kettle of fish" compared to the university games.

During her career as a referee she has officiated at games in the Women's Super League, and was referee at the 2017 and 2020 Women's FA Cup Finals. She also officiated at the 2020 FA Women's Community Shield. Since the 2018–19 National League season she has refereed at several men's National League matches. In December 2020 she was added to UEFA's elite women's list, joining other female football officials to referee at international games, including Stéphanie Frappart of France and Germany's Bibiana Steinhaus.

Welch's appointment to referee the Harrogate v Port Vale match was announced by the Football Association on 30 March 2021. The game proceeded smoothly with Welch officiating effectively. Port Vale won the match (2–0). Two players received yellow cards, but there was little dissent apart from a vocal complaint by Harrogate's Connor Hall about a possible penalty in the first half. The announcement made Welch the first woman to be appointed to referee an English Football League game, though not the first woman to referee during a game. Amy Fearn was substituted to referee the final 20 minutes of a match between Coventry City and Nottingham Forest in February 2010 when the original referee was taken off due to injury.

On 29 December 2021, it was announced that Welch would be the first woman to officiate a third round men's FA Cup match. The game in question, between Birmingham City and Plymouth Argyle, was played on 8 January 2022.

References

1980s births
Living people
English football referees
National League (English football) referees
Women association football referees
People from Washington, Tyne and Wear
Sportspeople from Tyne and Wear
National Health Service people
UEFA Women's Euro 2022 referees